Anand Jeevananthan (J Anand) is an Indian cinematographer. His debut movie was Vinmeengal directed by Vignesh Menon. His second feature film is Naveena Saraswathi Sabatham which released on 29 November 2013.

Personal life
Anand Jeeva was born in Coimbatore, Tamil Nadu as the eldest son of Jeeva Nanthan and Thamizharasi. His father is a notable artist, writer and film critic. He has a younger sister Meena. His uncle V. Manikandan is an acclaimed cinematographer.

Career
Anand Jeeva did his graduation in Visual Communication from Loyola College, Chennai. After graduation he was assisting G Venket Ram, a leading celebrity & fashion photographer. He later joined the Film and Television Training Institute, where he did his Dip. in Film Tech and T V Production (Cinematography). Then he joined as an assistant cinematographer to Nirav Shah. He became an independent cinematographer in 2011 by filming Vinmeengal, a Tamil film directed by Vignesh Menon. His second film is Naveena Saraswathi Sabatham directed by K. Chandru and produced by AGS Entertainment.

Filmography

References

Cinematographers from Tamil Nadu
Living people
Year of birth missing (living people)
People from Coimbatore
Tamil film cinematographers